The Crossroads Centre is a substance-abuse rehabilitation centre for drug and alcohol addiction located on the Caribbean island of Antigua in Antigua and Barbuda. 

It was founded with support from guitarist/singer Eric Clapton in 1998. He has been assisting with its funding by organising the annual Crossroads Guitar Festival since 1999.

History
The centre was founded by guitarist Eric Clapton & Richard Conte, CEO of The Priory Hospitals Group (London), and Transitional Hospitals Corporation (Nevada). All development of the facility was performed by officers and employees of these two companies. Conte & Clapton served as the centre's first two board members with Conte being chairman. Transitional put up all working capital during the development phase and the facility was initially owned 2/3rds by Transitional and 1/3rd by Clapton. Former prime minister Lester Bird of Antigua was integrally involved with Transitional and arranged for the government of Antigua's assistance with roads, utilities and a favourable land purchase price. Conte's wife is credited with naming the facility and his associate Lester Keizer of Transitional was the 'point man' on the project.

Location and description
The Crossroads Centre is located on the island of Antigua. It is a drug and alcohol treatment centre which has a 36-bed design. It opened in 1998.

Treatment
Crossroads Centre is a structured residential program which follows a 12-step approach that is modeled after the Betty Ford Center and Alcoholics Anonymous.  the facility has 36 beds.

Caribbean clients 
Crossroads is the only drug rehabilitation program on the island of 80,000 people. At a time when drug trafficking and addiction rates have been rising in the Caribbean, the facility will treat locals at low cost. Clapton's target is to have one-third of the beds reserved for permanent residents of the Caribbean islands.  about 15 percent of the beds go to poor people from Antigua and Barbuda.

Fundraising 
Eric Clapton personally organises the Crossroads Guitar Festival since 1999, with guests such as Albert Lee, B.B. King, Jeff Beck, Keith Richards, Keith Urban, Robbie Robertson and Robert Cray among many others. The 2013 two-day event at Madison Square Garden was the fifth such benefit concert. Also supported are two halfway houses for recovering addicts, on Antigua for local residents, and in Delray Beach, Florida for others.

References

External links
Crossroads Centre at Antigua

Drug and alcohol rehabilitation centers
Medical and health organisations based in Antigua and Barbuda
Buildings and structures in St. John's, Antigua and Barbuda
Eric Clapton
Organizations established in 1998
1998 establishments in Antigua and Barbuda